Sherline Williams (born 20 July 1977) is a Barbadian sprinter. She competed in the women's 4 × 400 metres relay at the 2000 Summer Olympics.

References

External links
 

1977 births
Living people
Athletes (track and field) at the 2000 Summer Olympics
Barbadian female sprinters
Olympic athletes of Barbados
Athletes (track and field) at the 1998 Commonwealth Games
Commonwealth Games competitors for Barbados
Place of birth missing (living people)
Central American and Caribbean Games medalists in athletics
Central American and Caribbean Games bronze medalists for Barbados
Competitors at the 1998 Central American and Caribbean Games
Olympic female sprinters